Magas Airport, also known as Magas Oskanov Airport or Sleptsovskaya Airport is an airport in the Republic of Ingushetia near Ordzhonikidzevskaya, serving the capital city of Magas and the largest regional city of Nazran. The name Magas comes from the medieval capital of Alania. The name is translated from Ingush as a Sun City. Prior to 1992 Magas Airport was a Soviet military air base. It is sometimes referred to as Magas Oskanov Airport, in honour of Soviet General and MiG-29 pilot Sulom-Bek Oskanov.

Services
Airport can service Boeing-737-400/500/800, TU-154, IL-76, YAK-42, TU–134, AN–24, AN–12, YAK–40, CRJ-100/200, and helicopters.

Airlines and destinations

See also 
 Nazran Airport

References

External links 

Airports in the Republic of Ingushetia
Airport
Airport